The Christmas Wish is a 1998 American made-for-television Christmas drama film starring Neil Patrick Harris and Debbie Reynolds. It premiered on CBS on December 6, 1998 and it was based on a novel by Richard Siddoway.

Plot
A businessman Will Martin tries to uncover a family secret for his grandmother Ruth Martin after he returns to a small town to modernize his family's real-estate company. During thanksgiving dinner his grandmother Ruth tells him she has discovered a woman named Lillian in her recently deceased husband Warren's journals. Warren had written about visiting Lillian every Christmas Eve since shortly after the death of his son and daughter-in-law in a car accident. The search for this mysterious Lillian takes Will on a journey through his grandfather's life and helps him to understand the true meaning of love and forgiveness.

Cast
Neil Patrick Harris as Will Martin
Debbie Reynolds as Ruth                         
Naomi Watts as Renee
Alexandra Wilson as Julia
Beverly Archer as Miss Enid Cook
Ian Meltzer as Justin
Gary Bayer as Jimmy Hanning
James Greene as Warren Martin
Jerry Douglas as Mr. Askou

See also 
 List of Christmas films

External links

1998 television films
1998 films
1990s Christmas drama films
American Christmas drama films
Christmas television films
CBS network films
Films based on American novels
1990s American films